Montgomery Village is a census-designated place (CDP) in Montgomery County, Maryland, United States, and a northern suburb of Washington, D.C. It is a large, planned suburban community, developed in the late 1960s and 1970s just outside Gaithersburg's city limits. Montgomery Village's population was 34,893 at the time of the 2020 U.S. Census, and it is a part of the Washington metropolitan area.

History

1960s
Montgomery Village was created in 1962 by Kettler Brothers, Inc. The vision for a planned community in Gaithersburg is credited to architect Charles Kettler, who incorporated Kettler Brothers with his brothers Milton and Clarence in 1952. The first land purchase was the Walker Farm in 1962. Subsequent purchases were the Thomas Farm, The Mills Farm, The French Farm, The Patton Farm, The Fulks Farm, The Wilson Farm, and The James Walter Deppa property. The Walker Farm was the largest of all the properties the Kettlers bought.

On February 28, 1966, the Kettler brothers broke ground for the first house in Montgomery Village.  The first model homes were opened in Lakeside of Whetstone in August 1967.  In September, more opened in the Clusters of Stedwick.  The Montgomery Village Golf Club also opened in September of that year.  The first residents of Montgomery Village moved in on September 25, 1967, in Goshenside.  They were the Bartik family.  Also on the same day, the Crosby family moved into a home on Whetstone Drive.

The Montgomery Village Foundation was incorporated in 1966. In 1968, the Whetstone Community Center opened, as did Whetstone Elementary and Montgomery Village Junior High schools.

1970s
In 1970, The Village Mall opened, which is now the Village Shopping Center on Montgomery Village Avenue. Then in 1971, a Holiday Inn was opened. In 1973, bus service to Washington, D.C., began.

1990s
In 1998, Montgomery Village began using its own ZIP code, 20886.

2000s
In 2007, Montgomery Village's YMCA swimming pool closed.

2010s
The Montgomery Village Golf Club closed November 30, 2014 and will be turned into a neighborhood.

2020s

Montgomery Village is seeing a surge in redevelopment. The Montgomery Village Center is being refaced and updated. Atlantic Realty is adding additional green space, a new Aldi grocery store, redefined retail (Big Lots) and restaurant (Ledos, Subway) space and an extension of Centerway Rd through the mall which will make access to both sides more convenient. There are planned condos and townhomes being added to the property. The "Professional Center" property has been purchased by Lidl, the German Grocery Store chain. Demolition of the existing building will begin in 2020 to make way for a new grocery store, with the addition of a pad site to the property which is currently for lease. Monument Realty has purchased the golf course and is approved to move forward with the Bloom Montgomery Village neighborhood featuring an 80-acre park and dog park, new single-family and townhomes. The groundbreaking is scheduled for March 2020 with the first model homes opening in fall 2020

Montgomery Village 'The Village" currently has a farmers market on Saturdays from May through October, free summer concerts selling beer & wine, 3 summer youth swim teams, All Comers Swim Meet,  3 Community Centers (2 are rentable), annual art show, 4 July parade and carnival and 5k, A great Pumpkin race and fall festival, Brunch with a Bunny, flashlight Easter Egg Hunt, seasonal indoor/outdoor flea markets, Holiday craft bazaar, Annual Thanksgiving morning workout, Community Christmas Tree lighting, Breakfast with Santa, Holiday Toys for Tots Concert, a full year-round recreation program, summer youth camp program, an Active Seniors group with weekly activities, daddy-daughter Valentines Day Dance, wine & paint nights, Bingo nights, September annual dog swim (in one of the many pools) several tennis courts, 7 seasonal swimming pools, a heated pool (extends summer swimming season) paved bike and walking trails, ponds for non-motorized boating and fishing, pedestrian tunnels located under busy roads throughout for pedestrian safety, several parks and tot lots, protected natural streams, public transportation, a new renovated County Library, 2 exits to I-270 (Montgomery Village Ave & Watkins Mill Rd/2020)

Geography
Although Montgomery Village is an unincorporated area, its boundaries are defined according to Montgomery County zoning rules and by its own unique ZIP code.  Montgomery Village can use Gaithersburg addresses even though the village is outside city limits. Montgomery Village is recognized by the U.S. Census Bureau as a census-designated place, and by the U.S. Geological Survey as a populated place located at  (39.176469, -77.192654).

Education
Montgomery Village is served by Montgomery County Public Schools.

Elementary schools
 Goshen Elementary School
 South Lake Elementary School
 Stedwick Elementary School
 Strawberry Knoll Elementary School
 Watkins Mill Elementary School
 Whetstone Elementary School

Middle schools
 Forest Oak Middle School
 Montgomery Village Middle School
 Neelsville Middle School
 Shady Grove Middle School

High schools
 Watkins Mill High School
 Gaithersburg High School

Demographics

2010
As of the 2010 U.S. Census, there were 32,032 people and 11,751 households residing in the area. The population density was 8,018 people per square mile (3,096/km2). There were 12,471 housing units.

The median income for a household in the area was $76,526. The per capita income for the area was $35,389.

2000
As of the 2000 U.S. Census, there were 38,051 people, 14,142 households, and 9,729 families residing in the area. The ethnic makeup of the area was 38.1% White, 23.2% African American, 0.2% Native American, 10.7% Asian, 0.0% Pacific Islander, 0.5% from other races, and 2.9% from two or more races. Hispanic or Latino of any race were 24.0% of the population.

There were 14,142 households, out of which 36.8% had children under the age of 18 living with them, 52.5% were married couples living together, 12.6% had a female householder with no husband present, and 31.2% were non-families. 24.0% of all households were made up of individuals, and 4.9% had someone living alone who was 65 years of age or older. The average household size was 2.68 and the average family size was 3.21.

In the area, the population was spread out, with 26.6% under the age of 18, 7.5% from 18 to 24, 35.4% from 25 to 44, 23.5% from 45 to 64, and 7.0% who were 65 years of age or older. The median age was 34 years. For every 100 females there were 90.9 males. For every 100 females age 21 and over, there were 87.7 males.

The median income for a household in the area was $66,828, and the median income for a family was $74,920 (these figures had risen to $89,601 and $97,837 respectively as of a 2008 estimate). Males had a median income of $50,046 versus $38,665 for females. The per capita income for the area was $29,620. About 3.9% of families and 7.1% of the population were below the poverty line, including 6.6% of those under age 18 and 3.4% of those age 65 or over.

References

External links

 
 

1962 establishments in Maryland
Populated places established in 1962
Census-designated places in Montgomery County, Maryland